Viables is a district of Basingstoke, England, that was formed around 1970 as part of the Basingstoke Town Centre Development Plan. The area is mostly made up of industry such as crafting centres, industrial and housing estates and the Jazz Buss Service. The area is bounded to the west by Hatch Warren and the A30. To the north is the district of Brighton Hill and the Cranbourne area.

The popular Craft Centre in the area was once an outlying farm, but due to the London overspill, the Viables and Brighton Hill districts were built around Basingstoke, declining the old farm.

References

External links
 Viables Comminuty Centre
Viables Craft Centre

Villages in Hampshire
Areas of Basingstoke